The 1915–16 Army Cadets men's ice hockey season was the 13th season of play for the program.

Season

Roster

Standings

Schedule and results

|-
!colspan=12 style=";" | Regular Season

References

Army Black Knights men's ice hockey seasons
Army
Army
Army
Army